The Swedish Bricklayers' Union (Murare) was a trade union representing bricklayers in Sweden.

The union was founded on 14 December 1890, at a conference in Lund, and then refounded in 1892 in Malmö.  It joined the Swedish Trade Union Confederation in 1899.  The union initially had 629 members, but grew steadily, reaching 4,468 by 1908, and 14,140 in 1960.  In 1961, it merged into the Swedish Building Workers' Union.

Presidents
1894: Nils Persson
1922: Victor Björkman
1950: Gösta Bengtsson

References

Swedish Trade Union Confederation
Bricklayers' trade unions
Trade unions in Sweden
Trade unions established in 1890
Trade unions disestablished in 1961
1890 establishments in Sweden
1961 disestablishments in Sweden